AAST or Aast may refer to:

 Academy for the Arts, Science and Technology, a branch school of the Horry County Schools system
 Arab Academy for Science and Technology and Maritime Transport, a maritime academy that has its main campus located in Alexandria, Egypt
 Aast, Pyrénées-Atlantiques, a commune of the Pyrénées-Atlantiques département, in southwestern France
 Academy for the Advancement of Science and Technology, part of high school Bergen County Academies in New Jersey, United States
 The American Association for the Surgery of Trauma, an organization that furthers the study and practice of trauma surgery
 American Association of Sleep Technologists, an organization that promotes the interests of sleep technologists